Anna Maria Hilfeling, née Lange (21 April 1713 – 26 May 1783) was a Swedish artist and portrait miniaturist.

Biography
Hilfeling was born in Stockholm, the daughter of a book-keeper. She displayed talent in drawing as a child, became a student of artist Burchardt Precht in 1722, at the age of nine, and was later a student of the artist Niclas Lafrenssen  (1698-1756). She was admired by Carl Gustav Tessin, and by the royal house. She painted in oil and made drawings, but was foremost a miniaturist. Among her clients were the king and the queen, king Frederick I of Sweden and queen Ulrika Eleonora of Sweden.

Hilfeling married the city surgeon Johan Gottfried Hilfeling in 1739. Their son, Carl Gustav Gottfried Hilfeling (1740-1823) also became an artist. Anna Maria Hilfeling died at Romelanda in Bohuslän.

References

Other sources
 Anteckningar om svenska qvinnor 
 "Svenskt Konstnärslexikon", Allhems Förlag, Malmö.

1713 births
1783 deaths
18th-century Swedish women artists
18th-century Swedish painters
Rococo painters
Swedish portrait painters
Portrait miniaturists
Artists from Stockholm
Age of Liberty people
Swedish women painters